Friedrich Bethge  (May 24, 1891 – 17 September 1963) was a German poet, playwright and dramatist.

Bethge was born in Berlin.  He was a member of the Nazi Party.  He died, aged 72, in Bad Homburg.

Works
 Pfarr Peder, Tragödie, 1924
 Pierre und Jeannette, Novelle, 1926
 Reims, Drama, 1929/30
 Das Antlitz des Weltkrieges. Fronterlebnisse deutscher Soldaten, Hrsg. E. Jünger und F. Bethge, 1930/31
 Die Blutprobe, Komödie, 1934
 Der Marsch der Veteranen, Schauspiel, 1935
 Das triumphierende Herz, Novelle, 1937
 Rebellion um Preußen, Tragödie, 1939
 Anke von Skoepen, Tragödie, 1940
 Kopernikus, 1942

References

1891 births
1963 deaths
Writers from Berlin
Nazi Party politicians
Militant League for German Culture members
German military personnel of World War I
SS-Obersturmbannführer
People from the Province of Brandenburg
German male dramatists and playwrights
20th-century German dramatists and playwrights
20th-century German male writers